Foxfire is a 1950 novel by Anya Seton. It was published by Houghton Mifflin. It was adapted as the film Foxfire (1955).

Plot 
New York socialite Amanda Lawrence falls in love with mining engineer Jonathan Dartland, but is ill-prepared for the harsh realities of life in the Arizona desert.

Background 
Seton was known for the large amounts of research that went into her novels. As a child, she spent much time on her father's Arizona ranch.

Reception 
Foxfire was a New York Times bestseller, peaking at #6.

The Washington Post called it a "workmanlike piece of story-telling that expertly integrates romance with color and suspense, a combination hard to beat for popularity."

Elizabeth Watts of The Boston Globe wrote that Foxfire was better than Seton's previous novel, The Turquoise. Mary Bosworth Hobbs of The Birmingham News said it matched Seton's previous works and was possibly superior in maturity of theme.

References 

1950 American novels
Novels by Anya Seton
American novels adapted into films